Fort Frederick may refer to:

Canada 
Fort Frederick (Newfoundland)
Fort Frederick (Kingston, Ontario)
Fort Frederick (Saint John, New Brunswick), built at the mouth of the St. John River in 1758 by the British during the St. John River Campaign of the French and Indian War

South Africa
Fort Frederick, Eastern Cape in the central part of Port Elizabeth

United States 
Fort Frederick (Albany), Albany, New York
Fort Frederick (Maine), a fort rebuilt 1729–30 on the site of Fort William Henry
Fort Frederick State Park, Maryland
Fort Frederick, South Carolina
Fort Frederick Heritage Preserve, South Carolina
Fort Frederick (Vermont)
Fort Frederik, U.S. Virgin Islands
 Fort Frederick, U.S. Virgin Islands

See also 
 Fort Frederica National Monument, on St. Simons Island, Georgia, USA
 Fort Fredrick, Trincomalee, Sri Lanka